Gyrtona polionota is a moth of the family Noctuidae. It is found in Fiji, New Guinea and Australia.

External links
Australian Faunal Directory
Image at Moths of Fiji

Moths of Australia
Stictopterinae
Moths described in 1905
Moths of New Guinea
Moths of Fiji